Jean-Marie Albert Bourgeois (19 November 1939 – 6 June 2020) was a French skier. He competed in the Nordic combined event at the 1968 Winter Olympics.

References

External links
 

1939 births
2020 deaths
French male Nordic combined skiers
Olympic Nordic combined skiers of France
Nordic combined skiers at the 1968 Winter Olympics
Sportspeople from Jura (department)